Sid L Mokhtar is a town in Chichaoua Province, Marrakesh-Safi, Morocco. According to the 2004 census, it has a population of 11,138.

See also 

 Chichaoua
 Imintanut
 Sidi Zouine

References

Populated places in Chichaoua Province